Broadway Stories is a studio album released by Christian singer Sandi Patty in 2011 on Stylo Entertainment. The album was recorded with The City of Prague Philharmonic Orchestra under the direction of conductor Jack Everly.

Critical reception

Jon O' Brien of Allmusic gave the album a 3 out of 5 stars rating saying "Broadway Stories' concept may be nothing new, but its sweeping orchestral arrangements, diverse material, and Patty's warm vocals ensure that it's one of the classier musical theater-based releases of the year." With a 4 out of 5 stars rating Andrew Greer of Christianity Today proclaimed "Recorded in Prague with a dreamy orchestra, Patty's illustrious power pipes perfectly master the challenging repertoire. But the five-time Grammy winner is more than a skilled technician. She is a heartfelt storyteller, making Sandi and Stories a winning combo."

References

2011 albums
Sandi Patty albums